Amblyseius cucurbitae is a species of mite in the family Phytoseiidae.

References

cucurbitae
Articles created by Qbugbot
Animals described in 1985